Treacher is an English surname; notable Treachers include:
Arthur Treacher (1894–1975), English actor
Bill Treacher (1930–2022), English actor
George Treacher (–1908), British architect
Sir John Treacher (1924–2018), British admiral
Sir William Treacher (1849–1919), British colonial administrator

See also
Arthur Treacher's, an American seafood restaurant chain
Treacher–Collins syndrome, a genetic disorder
Treacher Methodist Girls' School in Taiping, Malaysia